Jan Gustaf Troell (born 23 July 1931) is a Swedish writer-director, and cinematographer. His realistic films, with a lyrical photography in which nature is prominent, have placed him in the first rank of modern Swedish film directors along with Ingmar Bergman and Bo Widerberg.

Life and career
Troell was born in Limhamn outside Malmö, Sweden. For several years, he worked as an elementary-school teacher but started to make short films in the sixties. In 1965 he co-produced the film 4x4 and it was entered into the 4th Moscow International Film Festival. He became director of photography for Widerberg but soon made a debut with his own first feature, Here's Your Life (Här har du ditt liv, 1966), about a working class boy in Sweden, set in the beginning of the 20th century. The film was based upon an autobiographical novel by Eyvind Johnson. For the film he won the Guldbagge Award for Best Director at the 4th Guldbagge Awards. His next film Who Saw Him Die? (Ole dole doff, 1968) won the Golden Bear award at the 18th Berlin International Film Festival.

Troell's major work in the 1970s became The Emigrants (Utvandrarna, 1971) and its sequel The New Land (Nybyggarna, 1972), two epic films about some peasants emigrating from the barren Swedish countryside to America in the 19th century. Once again, Troell films were based upon the novels of a Swedish working-class author, in this case Vilhelm Moberg's famous Emigrants suite. As in many of Troell's films, Max von Sydow plays one of the major roles. The Emigrants was nominated for several Academy Awards.

After a brief and unsuccessful sojourn in Hollywood, which resulted in the films Zandy's Bride (1974), starring Gene Hackman, and Hurricane (1979), Troell made Flight of the Eagle (Ingenjör Andrées luftfärd, 1982). It is a film about S. A. Andrée's disastrous Arctic balloon expedition of 1897. The Flight of the Eagle was nominated for the Academy Awards (foreign-language film).

The release of Il Capitano: A Swedish Requiem (Il Capitano, 1991) became controversial since the film is based upon a true story; the brutal murder of a Swedish family just a few years earlier (see Juha Valjakkala). Yet, it concentrates on the psychological power game between the murderer and his girlfriend rather than the violence of the crime. He was awarded with the Silver Bear for Best Director at the 42nd Berlin International Film Festival. It also won the award for Best Film at the 27th Guldbagge Awards.

Troell has also made documentaries, for instance Land of Dreams (Sagolandet, 1988), dealing with modern society's alienation from nature and A Frozen Dream (En frusen dröm, 1997) in which he once again brings up Andrée's polar expedition. Troell took part of an extensive poll by Sight & Sound, where he revealed his favorite films to be Snow White and the Seven Dwarfs, Hugo, Modern Times, Hour of the Wolf, The Night of the Hunter and Some Like It Hot.

Despite his age (he is currently in his 80s), Troell has remained productive. His recent films include As White as in Snow (Så vit som en snö, 2001), based on the life of Swedish aviator Elsa Andersson; a documentary called Presence (Närvarande, 2003); Everlasting Moments (Maria Larssons eviga ögonblick, 2008), based on the life of Maria Larsson, a 20th-century, working class photographer; and his latest film, The Last Sentence (Dom över död man)., a biographical film about the Swedish publicist Torgny Segerstedt. The Last Sentence premiered in November 2012 at the Stockholm International Film Festival. At the same festival Troell was awarded the Lifetime Achievement Award.

Filmography

Fiction feature films

Documentary feature films

Short films

Cinematography only

References

External links
 
 
 

1931 births
Living people
People from Malmö
Swedish cinematographers
Swedish film directors
Silver Bear for Best Director recipients
Litteris et Artibus recipients
Best Director Guldbagge Award winners
Best Cinematographer Guldbagge Award winners
Directors of Golden Bear winners